Minyriolus is a genus of dwarf spiders that was first described by Eugène Louis Simon in 1884.

Species
 it contains four species:
Minyriolus australis Simon, 1902 – Argentina
Minyriolus medusa (Simon, 1881) – Europe
Minyriolus phaulobius (Thorell, 1875) – Italy
Minyriolus pusillus (Wider, 1834) (type) – Europe

See also
 List of Linyphiidae species (I–P)

References

Araneomorphae genera
Linyphiidae
Palearctic spiders